Funes is a small affluent city in the , located within the metropolitan area of Greater Rosario, about 15 km west from downtown Rosario. It has a population of about 23,500 inhabitants.

Funes was founded by Tomás de la Torre in 1874. At the time its name was San José. It was also known as Loma de Ávila.

The city has been dubbed "The Garden of the Province". On weekends and during summer vacations, it is invaded by visitors, especially from nearby Rosario; local sources estimate the number on 40,000. A large part of the urban infrastructure is devoted to private houses owned or rented by these occasional residents.

Location 
The city is located 21 km from downtown Rosario, 170 km from the capital city of Santa Fe, 310 km from Buenos Aires and 400 km from Córdoba.

The city extends east-west for more than 8 km from north to south and about 6 km at its peak. Rosario Bordered to the east, separated by the creek Ludueña, west to the town of Roldán, Santa Fe, separated by the street "San Sebastian" with the city north of Ibarlucea, Santa Fe and south by the town of Pérez, Santa Fe.

The city is bisected by the National Route 9 (continued from Córdoba in Rosario / Av Eva Perón Street), the RP34-S (north to south), Av Arturo Illia (ex Air Force and then street "Av. Mendoza " in Rosario / San José de Calasanz Av.), where the Aeronautical Military Lyceum of Argentina Air Force and AU9 (extension of Avenida Pellegrini in Rosario) is located. Four blocks north of the National Route 9, the municipality is crossed by the line of General Mitre Railway Nuevo Central Argentino.

Bordering the city is Islas Malvinas International Airport, jurisdiction of Rosario. The lands of the airport are partly included in the jurisdiction of Funes.

Funes has undergone a slow but important transformation in the past 20 years, going from a sleepy town on the outskirts of Rosario, to an important bedroom community, where new gated communities have sprung up around the exits on the Rosario - Cordoba interstate highway. This influx of homeowners and professionals from Rosario, Buenos Aires, and other locations has greatly expanded the city income through property taxes, but also fostered the growth of new services and eateries in the area.

References

 
 
 Cooperativa de Funes (in Spanish) - Brief history of Funes in the telephone cooperative website.
Municipio de Funes (in Spanish) - Official website.

Populated places in Santa Fe Province
Cities in Argentina
Argentina
Santa Fe Province